Below are the results for the 2011 World Series of Poker.

Key

Results

Event #1: $500 Casino Employees No Limit Hold'em
 2-Day Event: May 31 – June 1
 Place: Rio All Suite Hotel and Casino
 Number of Entries: 850
 Total Prize Pool: $382,500
 Number of Payouts: 81
 Winning Hand:

Event #2: $25,000 Heads Up No Limit Hold'em Championship
 4-Day Event: May 31 – June 3
 Place: Rio All Suite Hotel and Casino
 Number of Entries: 128
 Total Prize Pool: $3,040,000
 Number of Payouts: 16
 Winning Hand:

Event #3: $1,500 Omaha Hi-Low Split-8 or Better
 3-Day Event: June 1–3
 Number of Entries: 925
 Total Prize Pool: $1,248,750
 Number of Payouts: 90
 Winning Hand:

Event #4: $5,000 No Limit Hold'em
 3-Day Event: June 2–4
 Number of Entries: 865
 Total Prize Pool: $4,065,500
 Number of Payouts: 81
 Winning Hand:

Event #5: $1,500 Seven Card Stud
 3-Day Event: June 2–4
 Number of Entries: 357
 Total Prize Pool: $481,950
 Number of Payouts: 40
 Winning Hand:

Event #6: $1,500 Limit Hold'em
 3-Day Event: June 3–5
 Number of Entries: 675
 Total Prize Pool: $911,250
 Number of Payouts: 63
 Winning Hand:

Event #7: $10,000 Pot Limit Hold'em Championship
 3-Day Event: June 3–5
 Number of Entries: 249
 Total Prize Pool: $2,340,600
 Number of Payouts: 27
 Winning Hand:

Event #8: $1,000 No Limit Hold'em
 5-Day Event: June 4–8
 Number of Entries: 4,178
 Total Prize Pool: $3,760,200
 Number of Payouts: 423
 Winning Hand:

Event #9: $1,500 2–7 Draw Lowball (No Limit)
 3-Day Event: June 4–6
 Number of Entries: 275
 Total Prize Pool: $371,250
 Number of Payouts: 28
 Winning Hand: 8–6–5–3–2

Event #10: $1,500 No Limit Hold'em Six Handed
 3-Day Event: June 6–8
 Number of Entries: 1,920
 Total Prize Pool: $2,592,000
 Number of Payouts: 180
 Winning Hand:

Event #11: $10,000 Omaha Hi-Low Split-8 or Better Championship
 3-Day Event: June 6–8
 Number of Entries: 202
 Total Prize Pool: $1,898,800
 Number of Payouts: 27
 Winning Hand:

Event #12: $1,500 Triple Chance No Limit Hold'em
 3-Day Event: June 7–9
 Number of Entries: 1,340
 Total Prize Pool: $1,809,000
 Number of Payouts: 144
 Winning Hand:

Event #13: $1,500 No Limit Hold'em Shootout
 3-Day Event: June 8–10
 Number of Entries: 1,440
 Total Prize Pool: $1,944,000
 Number of Payouts: 160
 Winning Hand:

Event #14: $3,000 Limit Hold'em
 3-Day Event: June 8–10
 Number of Entries: 337
 Total Prize Pool: $920,010
 Number of Payouts: 36
 Winning Hand:

Event #15: $1,500 Pot Limit Hold'em
 3-Day Event: June 9–11
 Number of Entries: 765
 Total Prize Pool: $1,032,750
 Number of Payouts: 72
 Winning Hand:

Event #16: $10,000 2–7 Draw Lowball Championship (No Limit)
 3-Day Event: June 9–11
 Number of Entries: 126
 Total Prize Pool: $1,184,400
 Number of Payouts: 14
 Winning Hand: J-8-6-3-2

Event #17: $1,500 H.O.R.S.E.
 3-Day Event: June 10–12
 Number of Entries: 963
 Total Prize Pool: $1,300,050
 Number of Payouts: 96
 Winning Hand:  (Stud-8)

Event #18: $1,500 No Limit Hold'em
 3-Day Event: June 11–13
 Number of Entries: 3,157
 Total Prize Pool: $4,261,950
 Number of Payouts: 324
 Winning Hand:

Event #19: $2,500 Limit Hold'em Six Handed
 3-Day Event: June 11–13
 Number of Entries: 354
 Total Prize Pool: $805,350
 Number of Payouts: 36
 Winning Hand:

Event #20: $1,000 No Limit Hold'em
 3-Day Event: June 12–14
 Number of Entries: 3,175
 Total Prize Pool: $2,857,500
 Number of Payouts: 324
 Winning Hand:

Event #21: $10,000 Seven Card Stud Championship
 3-Day Event: June 12–14
 Number of Entries: 126
 Total Prize Pool: $1,184,400
 Number of Payouts: 16
 Winning Hand:

Event #22: $1,500 Pot Limit Omaha
 3-Day Event: June 13–15
 Number of Entries: 1,071
 Total Prize Pool: $1,445,850
 Number of Payouts: 117
 Winning Hand:

Event #23: $2,500 Eight Game Mix
 3-Day Event: June 13–15
 Number of Entries: 489
 Total Prize Pool: $1,112,475
 Number of Payouts: 48
 Winning Hand:  (Stud 8/b)

Event #24: $5,000 No Limit Hold'em Shootout
 3-Day Event: June 14–16
 Number of Entries: 387
 Total Prize Pool: $1,818,900
 Number of Payouts: 40
 Winning Hand:

Event #25: $1,500 Seven Card Stud Hi-Low-8 or Better
 3-Day Event: June 14–16
 Number of Entries: 606
 Total Prize Pool: $818,100
 Number of Payouts: 56
 Winning Hand:

Event #26: $2,500 No Limit Hold'em Six Handed
 3-Day Event: June 15–17
 Number of Entries: 1,378
 Total Prize Pool: $3,134,950
 Number of Payouts: 126
 Winning Hand:

Event #27: $10,000 Limit Hold'em Championship
 3-Day Event: June 15–17
 Number of Entries: 152
 Total Prize Pool: $1,428,800
 Number of Payouts: 18
 Winning Hand:

Event #28: $1,500 No Limit Hold'em
 3-Day Event: June 16–18
 Number of Entries: 2,500
 Total Prize Pool: $3,375,000
 Number of Payouts: 270
 Winning Hand:

Event #29: $2,500 10-Game Mix Six Handed
 3-Day Event: June 16–18
 Number of Entries: 431
 Total Prize Pool: $980,525
 Number of Payouts: 42
 Winning Hand: 10–9–8–4–2 (2–7 Triple Draw)

Event #30: $1,000 Seniors No Limit Hold'em Championship
 3-Day Event: June 17–19
 Number of Entries: 3,752
 Total Prize Pool: $3,376,800
 Number of Payouts: 396
 Winning Hand:

Event #31: $3,000 Pot Limit Omaha
 3-Day Event: June 17–19
 Number of Entries: 685
 Total Prize Pool: $1,870,050
 Number of Payouts: 63
 Winning Hand:

Event #32: $1,500 No Limit Hold'em
 3-Day Event: June 18–20
 Number of Entries: 2,828
 Total Prize Pool: $3,817,800
 Number of Payouts: 297
 Winning Hand:

Event #33: $10,000 Seven Card Stud Hi-Low Split-8 or Better Championship
 3-Day Event: June 18–20
 Number of Entries: 168
 Total Prize Pool: $1,579,200
 Number of Payouts: 16
 Winning Hand:

Event #34: $1,000 No Limit Hold'em
 3-Day Event: June 19–21
 Number of Entries: 3,144
 Total Prize Pool: $2,829,600
 Number of Payouts: 324
 Winning Hand:

Event #35: $5,000 Pot Limit Omaha Six Handed
 3-Day Event: June 20–22
 Number of Entries: 507
 Total Prize Pool: $2,382,900
 Number of Payouts: 54
 Winning Hand:

Event #36: $2,500 No Limit Hold'em
 3-Day Event: June 21–23
 Number of Entries: 1,734
 Total Prize Pool: $3,944,850
 Number of Payouts: 171
 Winning Hand:

Event #37: $10,000 H.O.R.S.E. Championship
 3-Day Event: June 21–23
 Number of Entries: 240
 Total Prize Pool: $2,256,000
 Number of Payouts: 24
 Winning Hand:  (Omaha-8)

Event #38: $1,500 No Limit Hold'em
 3-Day Event: June 22–24
 Number of Entries: 2,192
 Total Prize Pool: $2,959,200
 Number of Payouts: 216
 Winning Hand:

Event #39: $2,500 Pot Limit Hold'em/Omaha
 3-Day Event: June 22–24
 Number of Entries: 606
 Total Prize Pool: $1,378,650
 Number of Payouts: 63
 Winning Hand:

Event #40: $5,000 No Limit Hold'em Six Handed
 3-Day Event: June 23–25
 Number of Entries: 732
 Total Prize Pool: $3,440,400
 Number of Payouts: 78
 Winning Hand:

Event #41: $1,500 Limit Hold'em Shootout
 3-Day Event: June 24–26
 Number of Entries: 538
 Total Prize Pool: $726,300
 Number of Payouts: 60
 Winning Hand:

Event #42: $10,000 Pot Limit Omaha Championship
 3-Day Event: June 24–26
 Number of Entries: 361
 Total Prize Pool: $3,393,400
 Number of Payouts: 36
 Winning Hand:

Event #43: $1,500 No Limit Hold'em
 3-Day Event: June 25–27
 Number of Entries: 2,857
 Total Prize Pool: $3,856,950
 Number of Payouts: 297
 Winning Hand: :

Event #44: $2,500 Seven Card Razz
 3-Day Event: June 25–27
 Number of Entries: 363
 Total Prize Pool: $825,825
 Number of Payouts: 40
 Winning Hand: (6–9–8)-8-2-Q-(4)

Event #45: $1,000 No Limit Hold'em
 3-Day Event: June 26–28
 Number of Entries: 2,890
 Total Prize Pool: $2,601,000
 Number of Payouts: 297
 Winning Hand:

Event #46: $10,000 No Limit Hold'em Six Handed Championship
 3-Day Event: June 27–29 (extended to June 30)
 Number of Entries: 474
 Total Prize Pool: $4,455,600
 Number of Payouts: 48
 Winning Hand:

Event #47: $2,500 Omaha/Seven Card Stud Hi-Low-8 or Better
 3-Day Event: June 27–29
 Number of Entries: 450
 Total Prize Pool: $1,023,750
 Number of Payouts: 48
 Winning Hand:

Event #48: $1,500 No Limit Hold'em
 3-Day Event: June 28–30
 Number of Entries: 2,713
 Total Prize Pool: $3,662,550
 Number of Payouts: 270
 Winning Hand:

Event #49: $2,500 2–7 Triple Draw Lowball (Limit)
 3-Day Event: June 28–30
 Number of Entries: 309
 Total Prize Pool: $702,975
 Number of Payouts: 30
 Winning Hand: 8–7–6–4–3

Event #50: $5,000 Triple Chance No Limit Hold'em
 3-Day Event: June 29 – July 1
 Number of Entries: 817
 Total Prize Pool: $3,839,900
 Number of Payouts: 81
 Winning Hand:

Event #51: $1,500 Pot Limit Omaha Hi-Low Split-8 or Better
 3-Day Event: June 30 – July 2
 Number of Entries: 946
 Total Prize Pool: $1,277,100
 Number of Payouts: 90
 Winning Hand:

Event #52: $2,500 Mixed Hold'em
 3-Day Event: June 30 – July 2
 Number of Entries: 580
 Total Prize Pool: $1,319,500
 Number of Payouts: 54
 Winning Hand:

Event #53: $1,000 Ladies No Limit Hold'em Championship
 3-Day Event: July 1–3
 Number of Entries: 1,055
 Total Prize Pool: $949,500
 Number of Payouts: 117
 Winning Hand:

Event #54: $1,000 No Limit Hold'em
 5-Day Event: July 2–6
 Number of Entries: 4,576
 Total Prize Pool: $4,118,400
 Number of Payouts: 468
 Winning Hand:

Event #55: $50,000 The Poker Player's Championship

 5-Day Event: July 2–6
 Number of Entries: 128
 Total Prize Pool: $6,144,000
 Number of Payouts: 16
 Winning Hand:

Event #56: $1,500 No Limit Hold'em
 3-Day Event: July 5–7
 Number of Entries: 3,389
 Total Prize Pool: $4,575,150
 Number of Payouts: 342
 Winning Hand:

Event #57: $5,000 Pot Limit Omaha Hi-Low Split-8 or Better
 3-Day Event: July 5–7
 Number of Entries: 352
 Total Prize Pool: $1,654,400
 Number of Payouts: 36
 Winning Hand:

Event #58: $10,000 No Limit Hold'em Championship
 13-Day Event: July 7–19
 Final Table: November 6–8
 Number of Entries: 6,865
 Total Prize Pool: $64,531,000
 Number of Payouts: 693
 Winning Hand:

Notes

World Series of Poker
World Series of Poker Results, 2011